The Philadelphia Parking Authority (PPA) is an agency of the Commonwealth of Pennsylvania that manages many parking operations for Philadelphia.  
The PPA was created by the Philadelphia City Council on January 11, 1950, for the purpose of conducting research for management of off-street parking and to establish a permanent, coordinated system of parking facilities in the city. Since then, the PPA's scope has expanded to include parking operations at the Philadelphia International Airport, most street-parking policy enforcement, and regulation and enforcement of taxicabs and limousines.

The PPA's status as an agency of the Commonwealth of Pennsylvania rather than the City of Philadelphia allows for the Republican-controlled state authorities to offer patronage positions in the largely Democratic city. The former board chairman Joseph Ashedale has over 10 family members on the agency's payroll. An audit found the former PPA's director, former Republican state representative Scott Petri, did not meet the minimum qualifications of the job description and his $210,000 salary was above comparable positions in other cities.

The Parking Authority:
 Generates needed revenue for the city
 Coordinates the parking efforts of public agencies
 Builds and operates public parking facilities
 Does planning and analysis of parking requirements
to provide full parking services for Philadelphia residents, businesses and visitors.

In popular culture it is the basis of the reality television show Parking Wars.

Policies

Off-street parking
Originally, the Parking Authority provided parking garages and parking lots, but various city departments were responsible for on-street parking.

On-street parking

In 1982, Philadelphia City Council was authorized by the Pennsylvania General Assembly to delegate certain powers formerly exercised by various city departments to the Parking Authority. In April, 1983, City Council transferred on-street parking responsibilities to the Authority.

Functions transferred from the Streets Department:

 Location, installation and maintenance of all parking meters throughout the city
 Preparation of documentation to modify existing or implement new parking regulations, establishing time limits, loading zones, fire hydrant restrictions, reserved parking for people with disabilities, tow-away zones and residential permit parking
 Preparation of work orders for parking regulations signs

Functions transferred from the Revenue Department:

 Meter Collections

Functions transferred from the Police Department:

 Issuance and processing of parking tickets
 Towing of motor vehicles
 Impoundment of motor vehicles

However, both Police Department officers and SEPTA supervisors can issue parking tickets.

Functions transferred from the Department of Licenses and Inspections:

 Issuance of Loading Zone Permits
 Administration of the Residential Parking Permit Program

A vast majority of revenue for On-Street parking for PPA is generated from ticketing violations (63%) and meter parking (29%). Other revenue categories comprise less than 9% of PPA's On-Street parking income.

Booting
A program to "boot" repeat parking violation offenders was authorized by City Council in 1983.

Taxicabs and limousines
The Authority was authorized by the General Assembly in July 2004 to regulate taxis and limousines operating in the city, and to adopt and enforce regulations for their operations.

Red Light Camera Program
The Authority has been authorized by the General Assembly to administer a pilot red light enforcement program. Cameras are installed at intersections with a high accident rate, and fines are imposed for motorists who run red lights. Notices are sent by mail to offenders, based on photos of license plates and the motorists themselves.

Staff

PPA Executive Staff
 Executive Director – Dennis Weldon
 Deputy Executive Director – Richard Dickson
 Deputy Executive Director – Corinne O'Connor

Board Members

Originally, the Authority's board of directors was controlled by city officials, but the legislature, acting at the initiative of Representative John Perzel, has shifted control to state officials, including the Governor and officers of the legislature.

 Beth C. Grossman, Chairwoman
 Patricia M. Furlong
 Lynette M. Brown-Sow
 Alfred W. Taubenberger
 Obra S. Kernodle, IV
 Mark C. Nicastre

Finances

See also

 Parking Wars – A&E television series featuring the PPA

Notes

References

Government of Philadelphia
Municipal authorities in Pennsylvania
Organizations based in Philadelphia
Philadelphia